Selvam or Chelvam is a Tamil name meaning wealth and beauty.

First name
Selvam Suresh Kumar, cricketer for the Chennai Super Kings
Selva (director), a director of Tamil language movies

Last name
Cyril Selvam, judge

Nickname
Selvam Adaikalanathan, politician in the Parliament of Sri Lanka
S. J. V. Chelvanayakam, prominent post-independence politician in the Sri Lanka Parliament

Media
Selvam (1966 film) a Tamil film directed by K. S. Gopalakrishnan, starring Sivaji Ganesan and K. R. Vijaya
Selvam (2005 film) a Tamil film directed by Agathiyan, starring Nandha Durairaj and Uma 
Selvam (2011 film) a Sinhala film Sanjaya Leelarathne, starring Joe Abeywickrama, and Malini Fonseka

Surnames
Tamil masculine given names